Two ships of the Royal Australian Navy have been named HMAS Gascoyne, after the Gascoyne River, the longest river in Western Australia.

, a River-class frigate laid down in 1942 and paid off in 1966
, a Huon-class minehunter in service as of 2016

Battle honours
Ships named HMAS Gascoyne are entitled to carry five battle honours:
 New Guinea 1944
 Leyte Gulf 1944
 Lingayen Gulf 1945
 Borneo 1945
 Pacific 1945

References

Royal Australian Navy ship names